Iori Managed Reserve is a protected area in the Signagi Municipality in Kakheti region of Georgia near the border with Azerbaijan.

Iori Managed Reserve  is part of Georgia's Protected Areas which also includes Mariamjvari Strict Nature Reserve and Korugi Managed Reserve.

Iori Managed Reserve includes the parts of the  Iori river valley. It borders the Korugi Managed Reserve which covers the upstream of Iori river.

Iori Managed Reserve was established in order to protect tugay forest of the Iori river.

See also
Iori River

References 

Managed reserves of Georgia (country)
Protected areas established in 1996
Geography of Kakheti
Tourist attractions in Kakheti